The 1932 Catholic University Cardinals football team was an American football team that represented the Catholic University of America as an independent during the 1932 college football season. In its third year under head coach Dutch Bergman, the team compiled a 6–1–1 record and outscored opponents by a total of 123 to 21. The team's sole loss was to Holy Cross.

Schedule

References

Catholic University
Catholic University Cardinals football seasons
Catholic University Cardinals football